Kurt Bodewig (born 26 April 1955) is a German politician of the SPD.

Political career
From 1998 until 2000, Bodewig served as Parliamentary State Secretary under minister Reinhard Klimmt in the government of Chancellor Gerhard Schröder. In 2000, he succeeded Klimmt as minister. Following the 2002 elections, he was replaced by Manfred Stolpe.

From 2002 until 2009, Bodewig served on the Committee on European Affairs.

Other activities

Corporate boards
 Cologne Bonn Airport, Chairman of the Supervisory Board (2016-2018)
 Duisburger Hafen AG, Chairman of the Supervisory Board
 Abellio Deutschland, Member of the Advisory Board
 I-NEA Solutions, Member of the Advisory Board
 KPMG Deutschland, Senior Adviser

Non-profit organizations
 Global Panel Foundation, Member of the Supervisory Board
 Trans-European Transport Networks (TEN-T), Coordinator (since 2014)
 Deutsche Verkehrswacht, President (since 2007)
 Baltic Sea Forum, Chairman of the Board of Trustees (since 2003)

Recognition
 2013 – Honorary Degree, Hefei University

References

External links 
  
  

1955 births
Living people
People from Wesel (district)
Transport ministers of Germany
Construction ministers of Germany
Members of the Bundestag for North Rhine-Westphalia
Honorary consuls of Lithuania
Officers Crosses of the Order of Merit of the Federal Republic of Germany
Members of the Bundestag 2005–2009
Members of the Bundestag 2002–2005
Members of the Bundestag 1998–2002
Members of the Bundestag for the Social Democratic Party of Germany